Lecanemab, sold under the brand name Leqembi, is a monoclonal antibody medication used for the treatment of Alzheimer's disease. Lecanemab is an amyloid beta-directed antibody. It is given via intravenous infusion.

Lecanemab was approved for medical use in the United States in January 2023.

Medical uses 
Lecanemab is indicated for the treatment of Alzheimer's disease.

Adverse effects 
Lecanemab may cause amyloid-related imaging abnormalities.

Pharmacology

Mechanism of action 
Lecanemab is a monoclonal antibody consisting of the humanized version of a mouse antibody, mAb158, that recognizes protofibrils and prevents amyloid beta deposition in animal models of Alzheimer's disease.

History 
In July 2022, the US Food and Drug Administration (FDA) accepted an application for accelerated approval for lecanemab.

In September 2022, Biogen announced positive results from an ongoing phase III clinical trial.

In November 2022, it was announced that the drug was a success in clinical trials, and exceeded its goal in reaching primary endpoints.

The efficacy of lecanemab was evaluated in a double-blind, placebo-controlled, parallel-group, dose-finding study of 856 participants with Alzheimer's disease. Treatment was initiated in participants whose disease was in the stage of mild cognitive impairment or mild dementia and who had confirmed presence of amyloid beta pathology. Participants receiving the treatment showed significant dose- and time-dependent reduction of amyloid beta plaque: Those receiving the approved dose of lecanemab, 10 milligrams/kilogram every two weeks, had a statistically significant reduction in brain amyloid plaque from baseline to week 79 compared with those receiving a placebo, who had no reduction of amyloid beta plaque. 

The FDA approved lecanemab in January 2023, via the accelerated approval pathway for the treatment of Alzheimer's disease. The FDA granted the application for lecanemab fast track, priority review, and breakthrough therapy designations. The approval of Leqembi was granted to Eisai R&D Management Co., Ltd.

Society and culture

Legal status 
In January 2023, the FDA granted accelerated approval for lecanemab.

Economics 
However, cost-effectiveness analysis by the Institute for Clinical and Economic Review concluded that a broad range of $8,500 to $20,600 would be appropriate. According to an estimate by the manufacturer, Eisai, about 85% of eligible early-Alzheimer's patients in the United States are covered by Medicare.

Names 
Lecanemab is the international nonproprietary name.

Research 
Lecanemab was jointly developed by the companies Eisai and Biogen and is in clinical trials for the treatment of Alzheimer's disease.

It has shown statistically significant but minor progress, with studies suggesting a decrease in cognitive decline in Alzheimer's participants compared with a control group given a placebo instead.

References

Further reading

External links 

Alzheimer's disease
Breakthrough therapy
Monoclonal antibodies
Orphan drugs
Treatment of Alzheimer's disease